Damülser Mittagsspitze is a  high mountain in the Bregenz Forest Mountains in the Austrian state Vorarlberg.

The normal route starts from the upper station of a chairlift at 1810 m and is UIAA grade I.

References 

Two-thousanders of Austria
Mountains of the Alps
Mountains of Vorarlberg